Zia (also spelled Ziya, Ḍiya , Dia or Diya) is a name of Arabic origin somewhat translating to "Shine".

Notable people with the name include:

Given name 
Zia Mohiuddin Dagar (1929–1990), popularly known as Z. M. Dagar, Indian musician
Dia Abdul Zahra Kadim, Iraqi Shiite leader
Zia Inayat-Khan, (aka Pir Zia), spiritual leader of the Sufi Order International
Zia Mahmood, (born 1946), Pakistani contract bridge player
Zia McCabe, (born 1975), American musician and founding member of The Dandy Warhols
Zia Mian, Pakistani physicist and nuclear expert
Zia Mody, Indian legal consultant and businesswoman
Zia Mohyeddin (born 1933), Pakistani actor
Zia Uddin (born 1941), Bangladeshi Islamic scholar and politician
Zia Ul Shah, citizen of Pakistan held by the United States in Guantanamo
Ziya Tong, Canadian television host
Ziya Bazhaev, Chechen businessman
Zia-Allah Ezazi Maleki, Iranian Politician
Diaa al-Din Dawoud (1926-2011), Egyptian politician 
Ziauddin Sardar (born 1951), Pakistani writer on Islam
Ziyaettin Doğan or Ziya Doğan (born 1961), Turkish football manager
Ziauddin Rizvi (died 2005), Shi'a cleric from Gilgit
Ziaeddin Niknafs (born 1986), Iranian Footballer
Ziaeddin Tavakkoli, Iranian politician
Ziauddin Butt, a Pakistani military officer jailed as a result of the 1999 Pakistani coup d'état
Ziauddin (Afghan militia leader), Afghan militia leader
Ziauddin (cricketer), Pakistani cricketer

Surname 
Grace Zia Chu (1899–1999) author of Chinese cookbook
Helen Zia (born 1952), American journalist
Junaid Zia (born 1983), Pakistani cricketer
Khaleda Zia, former Prime Minister of Bangladesh
Muhammad Zia-ul-Haq, former President of Pakistan
Sameer Zia (born 1981), sportsman from the United Arab Emirates
Yasin Zia, former Chief of General Staff for Afghanistan

Known as 
Anastasia de Torby (1892–1977), also known as Lady Zia Wernher, Russian aristocrat
Park Ji-a (born 1972), South Korean actress also known as Zia

Fictional characters 
Zia, a character in the animated television series The Mysterious Cities of Gold
Zia, a character in The Red Pyramid novel
Zia, the main character in the film Wristcutters: A Love Story
Zia, a character in the video game Bastion
Dr. Zia Rodriguez, a character in the film Jurassic World: Fallen Kingdom
Zia, a character in the CGI animated film Barbie in Rock'n Royals
Zia Simpson, a Character who is the Daughter of Lisa Simpson and Milhouse Van Houtan in an episode of The Simpsons (Tv Series) |Holidays of Future Passed Season 23 Episode 9 (495th overall)

Arabic unisex given names
Pakistani masculine given names